Félix Francisco Nebbia Corbacho, better known as Litto Nebbia (born 21 July 1948) is an Argentine singer-songwriter, musician and producer, prominent in the development of the early Argentine rock scene.

Life and work
Litto Nebbia was born in 1948 in Rosario, Santa Fe to Martha Corbacho and Félix Nebbia, two musicians.
During his early teens, Litto left high school to join a friend, keyboardist Ciro Fogliatta, in a band: "The Wild Cats". The duo moved to Buenos Aires in 1963, and lived hand-to-mouth in a Balvanera ward tenement. They appeared in a television show, Escala Musical, a number of times, and became regulars at a popular neighborhood club, La Cueva, one of the cradles of Argentine rock. 

Nebbia and Fogliatta formed "Los Gatos" in 1966. The group became known for their all-night performances, and composed most of their own songs, many in the well-known neighborhood café, "La Perla del Once" (facing Plaza Miserere). One such composition, La balsa (The Raft), was written at that location by Nebbia and the ill-fated songwriter Tanguito on May 2, 1967, and following its release on the RCA Victor label on July 3, sold over 250,000 copies.

The album, which also included Moris Birabent's Ayer nomás (Just Yesterday) was the first local rock production to outsell either American or British rock titles locally, and the milestone became known as the birth of Argentine rock. The Argentine edition of Rolling Stone Magazine, in a 2007 retrospective, named the melancholy La balsa number one in the list of the 100 best albums in Argentine rock. Commercially, the album rescued the struggling group. Invited to perform the hit on television following its release, the group could only see themselves when the show aired at the kindness of an appliance store owner, who tuned a window display set to the program at their request.
   
Controversy ensued shortly after the hit's release however. A contentious debate soon arose as to whether Nebbia or Tanguito had contributed more to the composition (particularly after the latter's tragic, 1972 death).<ref>[http://www.igooh.com.ar/Nota.aspx?IdNota=5828 Los 40 de «La balsa», Igooh] </ref> La balsa also aggravated officials in General Juan Carlos Onganía's conservative dictatorship, who stopped short of banning a song they believed encouraged escapism and drug abuse, but retaliated by shuttering La Cueva, whose stage had become the focal point for local rock groups (including Los Gatos). The band itself began losing cohesion, as well: guitarist Kay Galiffi relocated to Brazil, and Nebbia left the group in 1969; by 1970, Los Gatos had dissolved.

Nebbia began a solo career with RCA Records, and his first album, Litto Nebbia, benefited from having a number of its tracks included in local filmmaker Julio Porter's El extraño de pelo largo (The Long Haired Stranger). His work drew from the folklorical Chacarera genre in 1971 and 1972, and in 1973, he founded the Litto Nebbia Trio, whose repertoire centered on jazz. Nebbia produced folk rock duo Pastoral's En el hospicio (In the Hospice) in 1975, enjoying success in his first foray into record production.
 

The advent of a new dictatorship in 1976, and his subsequent intimidation and detainment, forced Nebbia to seek exile in Mexico, however. He remained creatively productive in exile, and released some of his most successful albums during this era, including Canciones para cada uno (Songs for Each of You) in 1978, and Sólo se trata de vivir (It's Only About Living), in 1981. Expecting a daughter, Miranda, and heartened by an improving civil liberties climate, Nebbia returned to Argentina in 1982.

His return was followed by the Rosariazo, a May 1983 concert in which he was joined by chanteuse Silvina Garré, Juan Carlos Baglietto, and Fito Páez, among others; his 1986 release, Demasiadas maneras de no saber nada (Too Many Ways to Know Nothing), was his fiftieth. Martha Nebbia, his mother, had recently converted a former Villa Urquiza shoe store into her new residence, and invited her son to install a recording booth there. Reunited with Salvador Barresi, the recording engineer from his days with Los Gatos, they improved and equipped the ad hoc space, which was opened as a recording studio in 1988, and which Barresi named El Nuevo Mundo ("The New World").

El Nuevo Mundo Studios led to Nebbia's 1989 establishment of Melopea Records, which he named after both the Ancient Greek music theory, and his own, 1974 album of that name. Melopea Records became known for discovering and promoting new talents, as well as producing unreleased tango compositions from decades earlier. Some of these latter included works by consular figures in the genre, such as Juan Carlos Cobián, Enrique Cadícamo, and Roberto Goyeneche. Nebbia was named Illustrious Citizen of Buenos Aires in 2002.

Los Gatos, save for drummer Oscar Moro (who had died a year earlier), were reunited for a revival in 2007. Nebbia presented a nine disc anthology of Argentine rock in 2010, and hosted a gathering of fellow Argentine rock greats on 9th of July Avenue as part of official celebrations of the Argentina Bicentennial. Two of the most influential in the genre, Charly García and Luis Alberto Spinetta, acknowledged Nebbia and Los Gatos as inspirations for their own beginnings.Clarín: Somos hermanos de la vida (29 May 1998) 

Discography (Studio)Litto Nebbia, 1969Litto Nebbia, Vol. 2, 1970Nebbia's Band, 1971Despertemos en América, 1972Huinca (as Huinca), 1972Muerte en la Catedral, 1973Melopea, 1974Fuera del Cielo, 1975Bazar de los Milagros, 1976Cosas que No Quieren Morir, 1976El Vendedor de Promesas. 1977Canciones para Cada Uno, Vol. 1, 1978Toda Canción Será Plegaria, with Mirtha Defilpo, 1979Creer, 1980Canciones para Cada Uno, Vol. 2, 19811981, 1981Solopiano, Vol. 1, 1981Solo Se Trata de Vivir. 1982Llegamos de los Barcos, 1982Evita: Quien Quiera Oír que Oiga (Soundtrack), 19831992, 1984Para que Se Encuentren los Hombres, with Cuarteto Zupay, 1984En Brasil, Aquí y Ahora... , 1985Luna Caliente (Soundtrack), 1985O Segredo da Vida, 1985Demasiadas Maneras de No Saber Nada, 1986The Naked Word (Recorded in 1979), 1987Musiqueros, (Nebbia-Baraj-González), 1987Buscando en el Bolsillo del Alma, 1988El Jardín de la Esquina, 1988Las Tres Corazonadas (Nebbia-Baraj-Borda), 1989Homenaje a Gardel y Le Pera, 1990Los Aviadores (Soundtrack), 1990Nostalgias del Harlem Español & la Luna Centinela, 1990Las Aventuras de Rubén Rada & Litto Nebbia, with Rubén Rada, 1990Esperando un Milagro, 1992Argentina de América, 1992Seguro, 1992Las Boludas (Soundtrack), 1993Ponto de Encontro (Zé Renato, Litto Nebbia & Victor Biglione), 1994New York Es una Ciudad Solitaria, 1994Bolero Afrolatino, with Cacho Tejera, 1994Nebbia Canta Cadícamo, 1995Páginas de Vida, Vol. 1-4, 1994Pequeño Manual de Vos y Yo, 1996Tangos Argentinos de Enrique Cadícamo, 1996Malvinas (Soundtrack), 1997El Hombre que Amaba a Todas las Mujeres, 1997Matar al Abuelito (Soundtrack), 1998Romancero Gitano de Federico García Lorca, 1998Beatles Songbook: A Southamerican Vision, Vol. 1 & 2, 1999Siempre Bailan Dos, 2000Beatles Songbook: A Southamerican Vision, Vol. 3, 2001Corazones y Sociedades, 2001Las Canciones que Escribí en México (Y las que Aprendí...), 2001Celebración, 2001Brian Wilson: Tributo, 2002Canciones Desde Península Valdés, with Alfredo Lichter, 2002La Noche del Colibrí, 2002La Melancolía Vital, with Lito Vitale, 2003Las Aventuras de Domingo Cura & Litto Nebbia, with Domingo Cura, 2003Tango & Nocturno, 2004Una Mirada, 2004Danza del Corazon, with La Luz, 2007The Blues, 2007The Blues-Parte 2, 2007Bella Madrid, 2008Soñando barcos..., 2009La Virtud del Día, with Hugo Diz, 2009Abandoneado, 2010A su Aire, 2010La Canción del Mundo, 201111 (Vidas), with Alfredo Lichter, 2011Aire Fresco (Nebbia-Homer-Ingaramo), 2012En Medio de los Hombres, with Facundo Cabral, 2012Colegio Horizontes - Vamos a Escribir una Canción, 2013Film Music Songbook, 2014Aire Fresco 2014, 2014Canto de la Luna, 2016Archivo Jobim, with Silvina Garré, 2016Rodar (50 Años de Rock Argentino), with Pez, 2017Amigos del Litoral, with Los Núñez & Cacho Bernal, 2017Canciones de Tucumán a Rosario, with Leopoldo Deza, 2018Alma, 2018Siempre en Sábado, 2020Cuadernos del Cine Francés de los 60, 2021Nunca Encontraré una Casa Como la que Hay en Mí, 2021Cuadernos de Apuntes Sonoros, 2022La Suite Rosarina'', with Adrián Abonizio, 2022

References

1948 births
Living people
Singers from Rosario, Santa Fe
Argentine people of Italian descent
Argentine bass guitarists
Argentine rock musicians
Argentine male singer-songwriters
Argentine record producers
Argentine multi-instrumentalists
Argentine singer-songwriters
Male bass guitarists